Kyndil is a Faroese handball club in Tórshavn, which was founded on 10 March 1956. Kyndil has team in the best divisions for both men and women, the club has also children's teams for boys and girls. The men's team of Kyndil has won the Faroese Championships 30 times in the Atlantic Airways Division (The best Faroese handball division for men), which makes it the club with the most national championship titles for men in Europe except for the Czech club Dukla Praha, which won its national championship 31 times. The women's team have won the Farose championships 8 times in the Electron-division (the best Faroese handball division for women).

List of Kyndil Players with at least 100 Matches, Men and Women - Until 2005

The board 
The board of Kyndil since 8 June 2016:
Eli Thorsteinsson, chairman
Maibritt Johannesen
Ussa K. Hansen
Eyðfinn Guttesen
Salua Manai
Kristoffur Kristoffersen
Eyðun Mortensen

References

External links 
Kyndil.fo, Official Website of Kyndil Handball Club

Faroese handball clubs
Sport in Tórshavn